Valdek is a castle ruin in the municipality of Chaloupky in the Central Bohemian Region of the Czech Republic.

History
The name is probably derived from two German words: Wald (the forest) and Eck (a widespread part of places' names, meaning rock formation).

The castle was built around the middle of the 13th century (first written mention comes from the year 1263) by an aristocratic Buzic family. In 1623 it was described as abandoned. Passing centuries left only ruins, dominated by a still standing large round tower (bergfrit), built during the second half of the 13th century.

Several old myths and legends are associated with the ruins.

In the modern era
In 1926, the area around the castle became part of the Military training area Jince. The castle itself was still accessible (except during manoeuvres). After 1950, no access was allowed. After 1989, it became possible to visit the castle again but tourists were not allowed to stray from the road to the castle.

As film location
 1971–1972: F. L. Věk
 1997: The exterior appeared in the film Snow White: A Tale of Terror by Michael Cohn

References

External links
Castle details, pictures 

Castles in the Czech Republic
Populated places in the Beroun District
Castles in the Central Bohemian Region